Jana Strydom (born 12 June 1980) is a South African actress, television presenter, voice over artist and MC. She is best known for the roles in the television serials such as; 7de Laan, Egoli: Place of Gold, Swartwater, Erfsondes and Arendsvlei.

Personal life
Strydom was born on 12 June 1980 in South Africa. After completing her matric, Strydom went and worked in Europe for two years. Then she returned to South Africa and enrolled at the Tshwane University of Technology. She later graduated Cum Laude with a B-Tech Drama diploma.

Career
She started drama career with many theatre productions from 2001 to 2003 including; Medea, Vandag In Beeld, Maid in the New South Africa, 
Hamlet Machine, Beauty and The Beast, A Woman Alone, Die Invloed and Die Vrou Uit Die See. In 2004, she won the People Magazine's Crystal Award for the Best Newcomer to the South African drama. Meanwhile, she has worked for Franz Marx Films for few years. In 2009, she joined with the cast of season 10 of the M-Net soap opera Egoli: Place of Gold, where she played the role "Marcelle Crafford". The role became very popular among the public, where she continued to play the role until tenth season. Meanwhile, she presented and hosted the Talk show program Lifestyle.

In 2007, she played the role of "Kate Ferreira" in SABC2 drama series Erfsondes. She continued to play the role for six consecutive years for six seasons until 2017. In both 2010 and 2013, she was nominated for the Best Actress Award in TV Drama category at the South African Film and Television Awards (SAFTA). In the meantime, she joined with Danie Odendal Produksies. Under their banner, she played the role "Helena Moolman" in the SABC1 soap opera 7de Laan. In 2013, she appeared in the kykNET period drama series Donkerland with the role "Thea de Jager". Then she contributed with international Samsung campaign. In the same year, she won the Award for the Best Actress at the 2013 Silwerskerm Film Festival for her role in the short film Vashou Ding. She also earned three coveted ATKeertjie awards for her work in 2010, 2011 and 2013.

In 2014 she joined with the SABC2 drama series Swartwater and played the role "Karen le Roux", where she was nominated for Best Actress Award in TV Drama category at the 2015 SAFTA. Then in 2016, she appeared in the kykNET drama Getroud met rugby with the role "Gasspeler". In the preceding years, she played supportive roles in many television serials such as; in Die Boland Moorde as "Katinka", in season four of Suidooster as "Vivienne Venter", in Arendsvlei as "Eloise de Villiers" for two seasons, and in Die Spreeus as "Debra". In 2015, she acted in the feature film Treurgrond with the lead role "Helena Schoeman". The film received critics acclaim and Strydom won the Award for the Best Actress in a Leading Role at the RapidLion Film Festival in 2017. Then in 2018, she won the Best Supporting Actress Award in a Foreign Language Film for the same role at the International Filmmaker Festival of World Cinema, Milan.

In 2020, she made a supportive role as "Retha" in the third season of another kykNET drama Fynskrif. In the same year, she acted in the kykNET police procedural series Projek Dina with the role "Karen". In 2021, she appeared in the drama series Afgrond and played the role "Julia Cilliers".

Filmography

References

External links
 IMDb

1980 births
Living people
South African film actresses
21st-century South African actresses
South African television actresses
South African stage actresses
Tshwane University of Technology alumni